This is a comprehensive list of songs written or performed by pop duo The Carpenters, featuring Karen and Richard Carpenter. This list includes official studio albums, live albums, solo albums, and notable compilations that feature rare or unreleased material.

Song list

See also

Lists of songs recorded by American artists